The 1904–05 season was Blackpool F.C.'s eighth season (fifth consecutive) in the Football League. They competed in the eighteen-team Division Two, then the second tier of English football, finishing fifteenth.

New signings included Edgar Chadwick, from Liverpool, Bob Crewdson, who would go on to make over 200 league appearances for the club, and Hugh Morgan, from Accrington Stanley. Teddy Duckworth, after a season with West Ham United and Blackburn Rovers, returned to the club. Out went Geordie Anderson, who retired, John Rooke and Fred Pentland.

Chadwick was the club's top goalscorer, with eight goals.

Season synopsis
The campaign began with a goalless draw at home to Leicester Fosse on 3 September. It wasn't until their fifth game that Blackpool recorded their first victory. It came at Lancashire neighbours Burnley — Alfie Kearns scoring the only goal of the game.

Their next victory did not come until 3 December, just over two months later, 4–1 at home to Glossop. They won their next fixture, at home to Bradford City, before managing only one point from their three festive games. A New Year's Eve defeat left them with only thirteen points from a possible 34.

After an FA Cup First Round exit to Bristol City, 1905 started with a bang: 6–0 and 2–0 home wins over Barnsley and Burnley.

Three victories in five games lifted them briefly, but then six defeats in their final nine games saw them finish fourth-bottom, albeit twenty points clear of bottom club Doncaster Rovers, who failed in their attempt to be reelected.

Table

Player statistics

Appearances

League 
 Jack Parkinson – 34
 Tom Wolstenholme – 34
 Edgar Chadwick – 34
 Jack Scott – 33
 Bob Birkett – 32
 Edward Threlfall – 32
 Arthur Hull – 31
 Robert Hogg – 27
 Hugh Morgan – 25
 Marshall McEwan – 23
 John Waddington – 21
 Alfie Kearns – 15
 Tom Pratt – 8
 Lawrence Cook – 7
 Alfred Jolly – 5
 Joe Dorrington – 3
 W. Lowe – 2
 Bob Crewdson – 2
 J. Gow – 2
 Alfred Gittins – 1
 Fred Heywood – 1
 John Jones – 1
 James Reilly – 1

Players used: 23

No appearances: William Anderton, Charles Bennett, Teddy Duckworth and Alfred Wood.

FA Cup 
 Jack Parkinson – 1
 Bob Birkett – 1
 Edgar Chadwick – 1
 Lawrence Cook – 1
 Arthur Hull – 1
 Marshall McEwan – 1
 Hugh Morgan – 1
 Jack Scott – 1
 Edward Threlfall – 1
 John Waddington – 1
 Tom Wolstenholme – 1

Players used: 11

Goals

League 
 Edgar Chadwick – 8
 John Waddington – 6
 Robert Hogg – 5
 Hugh Morgan – 4
 Bob Birkett – 3
 Alfie Kearns – 3
   Jack Scott – 2
 Jack Parkinson – 1
 Tom Pratt – 2
 Edward Threlfall – 1

League goals scored: 35 (plus one own-goal)

FA Cup 
 Hugh Morgan – 1

FA Cup goals scored: 1

Transfers

In

Out 
The following players left after the final game of the previous season:

Notes

References 
 

Blackpool F.C.
Blackpool F.C. seasons